Arsène Randriamahazomana (born 13 August 1961) is a Malagasy sprinter. He competed in the men's 400 metres at the 1984 Summer Olympics.

References

1961 births
Living people
Athletes (track and field) at the 1984 Summer Olympics
Malagasy male sprinters
Olympic athletes of Madagascar
Place of birth missing (living people)